The 2011–12 Duleep Trophy was the 51st season of the Duleep Trophy, a first-class cricket tournament contested by five zonal teams of India: Central Zone, East Zone, North Zone, South Zone and West Zone.

East Zone won the title, defeating Central Zone in the final.

Results

Final

References

External links
Series home at CricketArchive

Duleep Trophy seasons
Duleep Trophy
Duleep Trophy